The 1931 Detroit City College Tartars football team represented Detroit City College (later renamed Wayne State University) as an independent during the 1931 college football season. In its third and final season under head coach Norman G. Wann, the team compiled a 0–6–1 record.

In January 1932, Sy Berent, a member of the team, led a petition drive in support of coach Norman Wann. The petition asserted that  the team's mediocre performance in recent years was the result of high academic standards, the school's lack of appeal as an athletic center, and "indifference and lack of support by the student body." Wann was nevertheless replaced as the head football coach by Joe Gembis. Wann remained on the school's faculty as a teacher of physical education.

Schedule

References

Detroit City College
Wayne State Warriors football seasons
College football winless seasons
Detroit City College Tartars football